The land area of Bermuda is divided into nine parishes.  There are also two defined municipalities, located in the boundaries of two of the parishes.

Parishes
Bermuda has nine "Parishes", originally called "Tribes".  Each of the nine parishes with the exception of St. George's covers the same land area, (2.31 square miles / 5.97 km2).  The Parishes are not administrative divisions, and have no relationship with Bermuda's electoral districts.

Note on pronunciation:
The "y" in Sandys is silent (though often mispronounced "san-dees", it should be "sands")
The second "w" in Warwick is not pronounced

Municipalities
Hamilton (City) (854) 
St. George's (Town) (1,527)

Whereas the town of St George's is surrounded by St George's Parish, Hamilton Parish and the city of Hamilton are not close to each other geographically.

Saint George's, the larger of the two municipalities, served as Bermuda's capital until 1815 until the newly established Hamilton replaced it.

Villages
Bermuda has two villages (unincorporated urban areas)
Flatts Village (412)
Somerset Village (1,000)

References

 
Bermuda
Bermuda
Bermuda geography-related lists